The 2013 World Junior Ice Hockey Championship Division I was played in two groups of six teams each. In each group the first-placed team is promoted to a higher level, while the last-placed team is relegated to a lower level. Divisions I A and I B represent the second and the third tier of the World Junior Ice Hockey Championships.

Division I A
The Division I A tournament was played in Amiens, France, from 9 to 15 December 2012.

Participants

Officials

Referees
  Thomas Chmielewski
  Tom Darnell
  Juraj Konc
  Anssi Salonen

Linesmen
  Matthieu Barbez
  Thomas Caillot
  Scott Dalgleish
  Andreas Kowert
  Jacques Riisom-Birker
  David Tschirner
  Sotaro Yamaguchi

Final standings

Results
All times are local. (Central European Time – UTC+1)

Statistics

Top 10 scorers

Goaltending leaders
(minimum 40% team's total ice time)

Awards

Best Players Selected by the Directorate
 Goaltender:  Luka Gracnar
 Defenceman:  Bjorn Uldall
 Forward:  Artur Gavrus

Best players of each team selected by the coaches
  Alexander Cijan
  Artur Gavrus
  Sebastian Ehlers
  Marius Serer
  Steffen Soberg
  Luka Gracnar

Division I B
The Division I B tournament was played in Donetsk, Ukraine, from 10 to 16 December 2012.

Participants

Officials

Referees
  Savice Fabre
  Linus Ohlund
  Vladimir Proskurov
  Tobias Wehrli

Linesmen
  Orjan Ahlen
  Andriy Bakumenko
  Oleksander Govorun
  Balazs Kovacs
  Peter Sefcik
  Florian Widmann
  Milan Zrnic

Final standings

Results
All times are local. (Eastern European Time – UTC+2)

Statistics

Top 10 scorers

Goaltending leaders
(minimum 40% team's total ice time)

Awards

Best Players Selected by the Directorate
 Goaltender:  Mykhailo Shevchuk
 Defenceman:  Alex Trivellato
 Forward:  Kacper Guzik

Best players of each team selected by the coaches
  Mate Tomljenovic
  Paul Swindlehurst
  Alex Trivellato
  Yesmukhanbet Tolepbergen
  Kacper Guzik
  Mykhailo Shevchuk

References

External links
IIHF.com

I
World Junior Ice Hockey Championships – Division I
World
International ice hockey competitions hosted by France
International ice hockey competitions hosted by Ukraine
2013 in French sport
2013 in Ukrainian sport